(born December 12, 1983) is a Japanese professional wrestler better known by the ring name . He is mostly known for his work in Kaientai Dojo and currently works for Big Japan Pro Wrestling (BJW) under the name .

Championships and accomplishments
Big Japan Pro Wrestling
 BJW World Tag Team Championship (1 time) – with Kengo Mashimo
 DDT Pro-Wrestling
GWC 6-Man Tag Team Championship (1 time) – with Asuka and Shinichiro Tominaga
Gatoh Move Pro Wrestling
Super Asia Championship (1 time, current)
Go Go! Green Curry Khob Khun Cup (2014) – with Kaori Yoneyama
Go Go! Green Curry Khob Khun Cup (2015) – with Mizuki
Global Professional Wrestling Alliance
Differ Cup Tag Team tournament (2007) – with Kengo Mashimo
Kaientai Dojo
Independent World Junior Heavyweight Championship (1 time)
Strongest-K Tag Team Championship (1 time) – with Kengo Mashimo
UWA/UWF Intercontinental Tag Team Championship (1 time) – with Mike Lee, Jr.
UWA World Middleweight Championship (1 time)
Kaientai Dojo Tag League (2007 and 2008) – with Kengo Mashimo
K-Survivor Tournament (2003) - with Kengo Mashimo, Miyawaki, Kunio Toshima, Mike Lee, Jr. and Yuu Yamagata
Tag Team Match of the Year (2006) with Kengo Mashimo vs. JOE and Yasu Urano on December 10
Tag Team Match of the Year (2007) with Kota Ibushi vs. Dick Togo and Taka Michinoku on December 1

References

Profile at Get Rave 3000

Japanese male professional wrestlers
Living people
1983 births
People from Matsuyama, Ehime
Sportspeople from Ehime Prefecture
21st-century professional wrestlers
Independent World Junior Heavyweight Champions
Strongest-K Tag Team Champions
UWA World Middleweight Champions
BJW Tag Team Champions